Craig Harris Carton (born January 31, 1969) is an American radio and television personality. He is the co-host of the Carton and Roberts sports radio program on WFAN in New York City, and is seen nationally on Fox Sports 1 as host of The Carton Show weekday mornings. He previously co-hosted Boomer and Carton on WFAN and later CBS Sports Network from 2007 to 2017.

During its 10-year run, Boomer and Carton became the most listened to show in WFAN history, placing first among men ages 25–54. In September 2017, Carton resigned from the program and WFAN after his arrest for securities and wire fraud. He was sentenced to three and a half years in prison, and after serving 12 months, he was released in 2020. That year, he was rehired by WFAN, for which he currently hosts the #1 rated afternoon-drive program with Evan Roberts. Carton also hosts a podcast and public service show called Hello, My Name Is Craig in which attempts to help listeners work through their gambling addiction and other issues. The show recently celebrated its 100th episode.

Early and personal life
Craig Harris Carton was born on January 31, 1969, in New Rochelle, New York. In March 2019, Carton revealed that he was a victim of child sexual abuse while at a summer camp. He graduated from New Rochelle High School and the S. I. Newhouse School of Public Communications at Syracuse University with a degree in broadcast journalism in 1991.

While in high school, Carton performed play-by-play duties for a variety of Westchester County high-school sporting events and was enrolled in a sports broadcasting class taught by legendary announcer Bob Wolff. As a college student, he worked as a DJ at several Syracuse nightclubs.

In his 30s, Carton was diagnosed with Tourette syndrome.

Carton's first book, Loudmouth: Tales (and Fantasies) of Sports, Sex, and Salvation from Behind the Microphone, was released on June 4, 2013.

Carton launched the Tic Toc Stop Foundation in 2013, which raises funds to combat Tourette syndrome and provide a camp for youths with Tourette named Camp Carton. Fundraising has included an annual golf tournament and a bowling event known as "Strike Out ."

Career
Carton began his broadcasting career in 1991 at WGR Radio in Buffalo. He went on to work at WWWE in Cleveland in 1992 and WIP in Philadelphia in April 1993. On WIP, Carton was a brash weekend host nicknamed "The Kid" and filled in on the station's morning-drive show.

Carton left the East Coast for Denver, working mostly at KKFN 950 AM, "The Fan." His morning show took off immediately and he became the highest-rated host in the station's history. He next took the morning slot on KBPI, where he hosted the market's top-rated local morning show. Carton left Denver to care for his wife Kim, who was pregnant with their first child.

In late 2000, Carton replaced Scott Kaplan on WNEW-FM's Sports Guys morning radio program in New York City, a job that he held for one year. He took the show in a new direction, adding stunts such as an on-the-air cockfight and "Pastapalooza." Carton was broadcasting live with Blain Ensley on WNEW during the September 11, 2001 attacks.

In July 2002, Carton began co-hosting The Jersey Guys show on WKXW. The show was nominated for a Marconi Award as the top mid-market talk show in the country.

Carton left WKXW in August 2007 for a morning opening at New York's WFAN as Boomer Esiason's co-host, replacing Imus in the Morning. The Boomer and Carton show reached number one (men 25–54) in the Arbitron ratings within a year, a ranking that Imus had not achieved since 1993. The show was simulcast on MSG Network from 2010 to 2013 and also on the CBS Sports Network starting in 2014. Boomer and Carton became the top-ranked show in New York, was nominated for multiple Marconi Awards and won several Cynopsis Media awards as the nation's top major-market sports-talk show.

In 2012, Carton hosted Spike's MMA Uncensored Live. Carton and Esiason announced a 2013 NBA game between the Brooklyn Nets and the Washington Wizards.

Arrest and conviction
On September 6, 2017, Carton was arrested by federal agents at his home in New York City on criminal charges of securities fraud, wire fraud and conspiracy to commit those offenses. Carton, Michael Wright, Dean Heiser and Joseph Meli were alleged to have defrauded $4.8 million from investors by falsely claiming that the group had access to millions of dollars of face-value concert tickets through nonexistent agreements with concert promoters. Although Carton proved in court via witness testimony and the Government also confirmed that he had bought the tickets in question, he allegedly used some of the funds from a ticket investor for gambling and only purchased the tickets at a later date, according to a parallel civil complaint filed by the U.S. Securities and Exchange Commission. Trial testimony further proved that Carton had no existing gambling debt at the time when the alleged fraud was perpetrated. The question became whether his credit-card purchase of the tickets five weeks after he had allegedly misappropriated the funds that he had received for ticket purchases constituted fraud. Carton's lawyers argued that money is fungible and, as such, the manner in which Carton had purchased the tickets was not significant as long as he actually purchased them as he claimed. The jury disagreed with their position.

After receiving an indefinite suspension from WFAN, Carton resigned from the station on September 13, 2017, ending his ten-year stint as co-host of Boomer and Carton and leaving Esiason as the sole host. Carton made the decision to give his former show "the best opportunity to succeed without further disruption." On March 29, 2018, Carton returned to radio as host of Carton & Friends on FNTSY Sports Network. In May 2018, Sports Byline USA acquired rights to syndicate the program on terrestrial radio.

Carton was convicted of fraud on November 7, 2018, in Manhattan federal court after a week-long trial. Sentencing was scheduled for February 27, 2019, before being delayed until March 15. Carton was sentenced on April 5 to three and a half years in prison and ordered to make restitution of $4.8 million. He reported to the United States Penitentiary, Lewisburg minimum-security satellite camp on June 17, 2019, to begin serving a minimum of 36 months of a maximum 42-month sentence.

Carton was released from prison to a halfway house on June 23, 2020, and ultimately to home confinement. While in federal prison, he completed a 500-hour cognitive behavioral therapy course that made him eligible for release. Carton served his entire sentence and was released from federal custody on June 8, 2021.

Return to WFAN 
On October 29, 2020, it was announced that Carton would return to WFAN, hosting the afternoon drive Carton & Roberts with Evan Roberts (replacing the retiring Joe Benigno) beginning November 9. On December 10, 2020, it was also announced that Carton would host a weekly program airing Saturday mornings beginning January 9 called Hello, My Name Is Craig on which he would discuss problem gambling.

In its first full ratings-book period, the new show was the highest-rated afternoon-drive sports-talk show in New York City.

In September 2022, Carton began hosting The Carton Show on weekday mornings for Fox Sports 1, while continuing to co-host his afternoon show with Roberts on WFAN.

Controversy and stunts

610-WIP
 On February 28, 1997, Carton reported that Philadelphia Flyers captain Eric Lindros had missed a game against the Pittsburgh Penguins on February 15 because he was hung over. Carton claimed that the Flyers' reason (a sore back) for Lindros missing the game was a cover-up. The Flyers immediately sued WIP, resulting in an out-of-court settlement. Two years later, Flyers ownership admitted that the allegation was actually true.

WFAN
 On January 18, 2008, Carton walked the Brooklyn Bridge holding a sign reading "Any Given Sunday" and wearing only a Speedo and a New York Giants tight end Jeremy Shockey jersey after betting that the New York Giants would lose to the Dallas Cowboys in the 2008 NFL playoffs. He duplicated the stunt on January 8, 2010, after betting that the New York Jets would miss the playoffs.

Awards
 Talkers Magazine has named Carton the second-most important and influential sports talk-show host in the nation each year in its "Heavy Hundred Sports Talk Show List." Carton has also been listed among top 40 most important and influential talk-show hosts in the country for ten straight years.
 PoliticsNJ.com named Carton the ninth-most politically influential personality in New Jersey in 2007.

References

External links

1969 births
Living people
American people convicted of fraud
American sports radio personalities
People from New Rochelle, New York
S.I. Newhouse School of Public Communications alumni
People with Tourette syndrome
New Rochelle High School alumni
Prisoners and detainees of the United States federal government